Dobrada is a municipality in the state of São Paulo in Brazil. The population is 9,010 (2020 est.) in an area of 150 km². The elevation is 150.55 m.

References

Municipalities in São Paulo (state)